The 29th Lo Nuestro Awards ceremony, presented by the American network Univision, honoring the best Latin music of 2016 in the United States, took place on February 23, 2017, at the American Airlines Arena in Miami, Florida beginning at 5:00 p.m. PST (8:00 p.m. EST). During the ceremony, Lo Nuestro Awards were presented in 26 categories. The ceremony was televised in the United States by Univision. Alejandra Espinoza and William Valdés hosted the show.

Latin American boyband CNCO, Colombian singer-songwriters Shakira and Carlos Vives, and Cuban ensemble Gente de Zona earned three awards each, including Pop/Rock Album of the Year and Pop Song of the Year for CNCO; Colombian reggaeton performer J Balvin received the Artist of the Year accolade for the second year in a row. American artist Romeo Santos received the Excellence Award and TV host Lili Estefan earned the Trajectory Award. The telecast garnered in average 10 million viewers in North America.

Winners and nominees
 
 
On December 6, 2016, the nominees for the Lo Nuestro Awards of 2017 were announced through their official website. Mexican ensemble Banda Sinaloense MS de Sergio Lizárraga and reggaeton act Wisin received the most nominations with seven each. Among others, Banda MS was nominated for Artist of the Year, and won for Regional Mexican Album (Qué Bendición)  and Regional Mexican Song ("Solo Con Verte"); Wisin earned the Collaboration of the Year for "Duele el Corazón", his Billboard Latin Songs number-one single performed alongside Spanish singer Enrique Iglesias; with the song, Iglesias became the male performer with the most number-one songs in the history of the Billboard Dance Club Songs chart, with 14. "La Bicicleta" by Carlos Vives and Shakira earned all the awards it was nominated for, which included Single of the Year, Video of the Year and Tropical Song.

Mexican artist Thalía was named Pop Female Artist, her first win in the category since 1998. Musical ensembles CNCO and Gente de Zona earned three awards each. J Balvin won for Artist of the Year for the second consecutive time. Romeo Santos received the Excellence Award and TV host Lili Estefan earned the Trajectory Award.

Winners are listed first, highlighted in boldface and indicated with a double-dagger.

Ceremony information

Categories and voting process
The categories considered were for the Pop, Tropical, Regional Mexican, and Urban genres, with additional awards for the General Field that includes nominees from all genres, for the Artist of the Year, Album of the Year, Single of the Year, Male and Female Artist, Duo or Group, Collaboration and Music Video categories. The nominees were selected through an online voting poll at the official website and a total of 70 artist were included in the nominations; the winners were chosen from a total 26 different categories. The ceremony was hosted by Mexican model Alejandra Espinoza and Cuban actor William Valdés.

Ratings and reception

The American telecast on Univision drew in an average 10 million people during its three hours of length. Univision was third in the ratings during its first two hours, but rose to number one in the third, last hour of the broadcast. According to Glenn Santana of the newspaper Primera Hora, the ratings were lower comparing to those of the previous year, and they have continually decreased since 2011 when they registered 26.4 million viewers.

References

2017 music awards
Lo Nuestro Awards by year
2017 in Florida
2017 in Latin music
2010s in Miami